Live is the eleventh album released by The Manhattan Transfer. It was recorded live at the Nakano Sun Plaza Hall in Japan on 20 & 21 February 1986.  It was released in 1987.

This was the group's second live album, and the first live album with Cheryl Bentyne in the group.

Track listing
 "Four Brothers" (Jimmy Giuffre, Jon Hendricks) - 4:04
 "Rambo" (Count Basie, J. J. Johnson, Jon Hendricks) - 3:44
 "(You Should) Meet Benny Bailey" (Quincy Jones, Jon Hendricks) - 3:12
 "Airegin" (Sonny Rollins, Jon Hendricks) - 4:21
 "To You" (Jimmy Giuffre, Thad Jones) - 4:18
 "Sing Joy Spring" (Clifford Brown, Jon Hendricks) - 6:45
 "Move" (Denzil Best, Jon Hendricks, Paul Wash) - 3:26
 "That's Killer Joe" (Benny Golson, Jon Hendricks) - 5:02
 "The Duke of Dubuque" (Bill Faber, James Marchant, Lawrence Royal) - 2:49
 "Gloria" (Adam R. Levy, Esther Navarro) - 2:56
 "On the Boulevard" (Richard Page) - 3:41
 "Shaker Song" (David Lasley, Allee Willis) - 3:57
 "Ray's Rockhouse" (Ray Charles, Jon Hendricks) - 5:10

Personnel 
The Manhattan Transfer
 Cheryl Bentyne, Tim Hauser, Alan Paul and Janis Siegel – vocals

The Band
 Yaron Gershovsky – keyboards, musical director
 Wayne Johnson – guitars
 Alex Blake – bass guitar, acoustic bass
 Buddy Williams – drums, Yamaha BX-1 headless bass
 Don Roberts – reeds

Production 
 Producer – Tim Hauser
 Recording Engineer – Seigen Ono
 Remix Engineer – Brian Malouf
 Mixing on Track 8 – Ed Thacker
 Digital Sequencing – David Collins
 CD Mastering – Stephen Innocenzi
 Original Mastering – Stephen Marcussen
 Art Direction and Design – Fayette Hauser

Studios 
 Remixed at Post Logic Studios (Hollywood, California) and Can-Am Recorders (Tarzana, California).
 Mastered at Precision Lacquer (Hollywood, California).

Sources
 The Manhattan Transfer Official Website

The Manhattan Transfer albums
1987 live albums
Atlantic Records live albums